Camilla is a genus of flies, from the family Camillidae. Species are small slender, dark flies generally  in length.

Species
Camilla atrimana 
Camilla flavicauda 
Camilla fuscipes
Camilla glabra
Camilla nigrifrons 
Camilla acutipennis
Camilla africana
Camilla armata
Camilla arnaudi
Camilla atrimana
Camilla capensis
Camilla manningi
Camilla mathisi
Camilla mongolica
Camilla orientalis
Camilla pruinosa
Camilla sabroskyi
Camilla seticosta
Camilla varipes

Identification
Papp, L. 1985. A key of the World species of Camillidae (Diptera). Acta zoologica hungarica 31: 217–227.
Collin, J.E. 1933. Five new species of Diptera. Entomologist's monthly Magazine 69: 272–275. (British Species)

Camillidae
Ephydroidea genera